This is a list of high schools in the state of Arkansas.

All schools are comprehensive public high schools unless otherwise denoted:
 # denotes a charter school.
 % denotes a magnet school.
 † denotes a private school.
 ℝ denotes a residential or boarding school.
 ⊗ denotes a closed or defunct school.

Arkansas County

DeWitt High School, DeWitt
 ⊗ Gillett High School, Gillett (closed merged with DeWitt)
 ⊗ Humphrey High School, Humphrey (closed merged with DeWitt)
Stuttgart High School, Stuttgart

Ashley County

Crossett High School, Crossett
Hamburg High School, Hamburg

Baxter County

 Cotter High School, Cotter
 Norfork High School, Norfork

Mountain Home

 # Mountain Home High School Career Academies

Benton County

 Decatur High School, Decatur
 Gravette High School, Gravette
 Pea Ridge High School, Pea Ridge
Siloam Springs High School, Siloam Springs

Bentonville

 Bentonville High School

Gentry

 Gentry High School
 † ℝ Ozark Adventist Academy

Rogers

 # Arkansas Arts Academy High School
Rogers High School
Rogers Heritage High School
Rogers New Technology High School

Boone County

 Alpena High School, Alpena
 Bergman High School, Bergman
 Harrison High School, Harrison
 Lead Hill High School, Lead Hill
 Omaha High School, Omaha
 Valley Springs High School, Valley Springs

Bradley County

 Hermitage High School, Hermitage
 Warren High School, Warren

Calhoun County
 Hampton High School, Hampton

Carroll County

 Berryville High School, Berryville
 Green Forest High School, Green Forest

Eureka Springs

 † Clear Spring School
 Eureka Springs High School

Chicot County

 Dermott High School, Dermott
 Lakeside High School, Lake Village

Clark County

 Arkadelphia High School, Arkadelphia
 Gurdon High School, Gurdon
 Centerpoint High School, Rosboro

Clay County

 Corning High School, Corning
 Piggott High School, Piggott
 Rector High School, Rector

Cleburne County

 Concord High School, Concord
 Heber Springs High School, Heber Springs
 Quitman High School, Quitman
 West Side High School, Greers Ferry

Cleveland County

Rison

 Rison High School
 Woodlawn High School

Columbia County

 Emerson High School, Emerson
 Magnolia High School, Magnolia
 Taylor High School, Taylor

Conway County

 Nemo Vista High School, Center Ridge
 Wonderview High School, Hattieville

Morrilton

 Morrilton High School
 † Sacred Heart High School

Craighead County

 Bay High School, Bay
 Brookland High School, Brookland
 Buffalo Island Central High School, Monette
 Riverside High School, Lake City

Jonesboro

 Jonesboro High School
 Nettleton High School
 † Ridgefield Christian School
 Valley View High School
 Westside High School

Crawford County

Alma High School, Alma
 Cedarville High School, Cedarville
Mountainburg High School, Mountainburg
 Mulberry High School, Mulberry
Van Buren High School, Van Buren

Crittenden County

Earle High School, Earle
Marion High School, Marion

West Memphis

Academies of West Memphis
 † West Memphis Christian School

Cross County

Cross County High School, Cherry Valley
Wynne High School, Wynne

Dallas County

 Fordyce High School, Fordyce
 Sparkman High School, Sparkman

Desha County

 Dumas High School, Dumas
 McGehee High School, McGehee

Drew County

Monticello

Drew Central High School
Monticello High School
Monticello Vocational Center

Faulkner County

Greenbrier High School, Greenbrier
Guy–Perkins High School, Guy
Mayflower High School, Mayflower
Mount Vernon–Enola High School, Mount Vernon
Vilonia High School, Vilonia

Conway

 † Conway Christian High School
Conway High School
 † St. Joseph High School

Franklin County

 Charleston High School, Charleston
 County Line High School, Branch
 Ozark High School, Ozark

Fulton County

 Mammoth Spring High School, Mammoth Spring
 Salem High School, Salem
 Viola High School, Viola

Garland County

Jessieville High School, Jessieville
Lake Hamilton High School, Pearcy
Mountain Pine High School, Mountain Pine

Hot Springs

 % ℝ Arkansas School for Mathematics, Sciences, and the Arts
Cutter–Morning Star High School
Fountain Lake High School
 % Hot Springs High School
Lakeside High School

Grant County

 Poyen High School, Poyen
 Sheridan High School, Sheridan

Greene County
 Marmaduke High School, Marmaduke

Paragould

 † Crowley's Ridge Academy
 Greene County Tech High School
 Paragould High School

Hempstead County

 Blevins High School, Blevins
 Mineral Springs High School, Saratoga

Hope

 Hope High School
 Spring Hill High School

Hot Spring County

 Bismarck High School, Bismarck
 Ouachita High School, Donaldson

Malvern

 Glen Rose High School
 Magnet Cove High School
 Malvern High School

Howard County

 Dierks High School, Dierks
 Mineral Springs High School, Mineral Springs
 Nashville High School, Nashville
 Umpire High School, Umpire

Independence County

 Cedar Ridge High School, Newark
 Midland High School, Pleasant Plains

Batesville

 Batesville High School
 Southside High School

Izard County

 Calico Rock High School, Calico Rock
 Izard County Consolidated High School, Brockwell
 Melbourne High School, Melbourne

Jackson County

 Newport High School, Newport
 Tuckerman High School, Tuckerman

Jefferson County
White Hall High School, White Hall

Pine Bluff

Dollarway High School
Pine Bluff High School
Ridgway Christian School
 †⊗ St. Joseph Catholic High School
Watson Chapel High School

Johnson County

 Clarksville High School, Clarksville
 Lamar High School, Lamar
 Oark High School, Oark
 Westside High School, Coal Hill

Lafayette County

 Bradley High School, Bradley
 Lafayette County High School, Stamps

Lawrence County

⊗Black Rock High School, Black Rock
 Hoxie High School, Hoxie
 Hillcrest High School, Strawberry
 Sloan–Hendrix High School, Imboden
 Walnut Ridge High School, Walnut Ridge

Lee County
 Lee High School, Marianna

Lincoln County

  ⊗ Grady High School, Grady
 Star City High School, Star City

Little River County

 Ashdown High School, Ashdown
 Foreman High School, Foreman

Logan County

Booneville High School, Booneville
J. D. Leftwich High School, Magazine
Paris High School, Paris
Scranton High School, Scranton
 ℝ † Subiaco Academy, Subiaco

Lonoke County

 Carlisle High School, Carlisle
 England High School, England
 Lonoke High School, Lonoke

Cabot

 Cabot Freshman Academy
 Cabot High School

Madison County

Huntsville High School, Huntsville
Kingston High School, Kingston
St. Paul High School, St. Paul

Marion County

 Bruno–Pyatt High School, Everton
 Flippin High School, Flippin
 Yellville–Summit High School, Yellville

Miller County
 Fouke High School, Fouke

Texarkana

 % Arkansas High School
 Genoa Central High School
 † Trinity Christian High School

Mississippi County

Armorel High School, Armorel
Gosnell High School, Gosnell
Manila High School, Manila
Osceola High School, Osceola
Rivercrest High School, Wilson

Blytheville

Blytheville High School
KIPP Blytheville

Monroe County

 Brinkley High School, Brinkley
 Clarendon High School, Clarendon

Montgomery County

 Caddo Hills High School, Norman
 Mount Ida High School, Mount Ida
 Oden High School, Oden

Nevada County

 Nevada High School, Rosston
 Prescott High School, Prescott

Newton County

 Deer High School, Deer
 Jasper High School, Jasper
 Mount Judea High School, Mount Judea
 Western Grove High School, Western Grove

Ouachita County

 Bearden High School, Bearden
 Stephens High School, Stephens

Camden

 Camden Fairview High School
 Harmony Grove High School

Perry County

 Bigelow High School, Bigelow
 Perryville High School, Perryville

Phillips County

 Barton High School, Barton
 Central High School, West Helena
 KIPP: Delta Collegiate High School, Helena

Marvell

 † Marvell Academy
 Marvell High School

Pike County

 Centerpoint High School, Amity
 ⊗ Delight High School, Delight
 Kirby High School, Kirby
 Murfreesboro High School, Murfreesboro

Poinsett County

 East Poinsett County High School, Lepanto
 Harrisburg High School, Harrisburg
 Marked Tree High School, Marked Tree
 Trumann High School, Trumann
 ⊗Weiner High School, Weiner (closed 2012)

Polk County

Cossatot River High School, Cove
 ⊗Van–Cove High School, Cove
 ⊗Wickes High School, Wickes

Mena

 Acorn High School
 Mena High School

Pope County

Atkins High School, Atkins
Dover High School, Dover
Hector High School, Hector
Pottsville High School, Pottsville
Russellville High School, Russellville

Prairie County
 Des Arc High School, Des Arc
 Hazen High School, Hazen

Pulaski County

Jacksonville

 Jacksonville High School
 North Pulaski High School

Little Rock

Public/Magnet/Charter

 Arkansas School for the Blind
 ℝ Arkansas School for the Deaf
 Little Rock Central High School
 Hall High School
 %⊗ J. A. Fair Systems Magnet High School
 Joe T. Robinson High School
 # LISA Academy Public Charter High School
 %⊗ McClellan Magnet High School
 Metropolitan Vo-Tech High School
 % Parkview Arts and Science Magnet High School
 % Wilbur D. Mills High School

Private/Religious

 † Catholic High School for Boys
 † Mount St. Mary Academy
 † Episcopal Collegiate School
 † Pulaski Academy
 † Little Rock Christian Academy

Maumelle

 # Academics Plus High Charter School
 Maumelle High School

North Little Rock

 † Central Arkansas Christian Schools
 North Little Rock High School
 ⊗ Oak Grove High School (closed spring 2011)

Sherwood

 # LISA Academy North Public Charter High School
 Sylvan Hills High School

Randolph County 

 Maynard High School, Maynard
 Pocahontas High School, Pocahontas

St. Francis County

 ⊗ Hughes High School, Hughes
 Palestine–Wheatley High School, Palestine

Forrest City

 Forrest City High School

Saline County

Bauxite High School, Bauxite
⊗ Paron High School, Paron

Benton

Benton High School
Harmony Grove High School

Bryant

Bryant High School

Scott County

 Mansfield High School, Mansfield
 Waldron High School, Waldron

Searcy County

 Marshall High School, Marshall
 North Central Vocational Center, Leslie
 St. Joe High School, St. Joe

Sebastian County

 Greenwood High School, Greenwood
 Hackett High School, Hackett
 Hartford High School, Hartford
 Lavaca High School, Lavaca

Fort Smith

 Northside High School
 Southside High School
 † Union Christian Academy

Sevier County

 De Queen High School, De Queen
 Horatio High School, Horatio
 ⊗ Lockesburg High School, Lockesburg

Sharp County

 Cave City High School, Cave City
 Highland High School, Hardy
 ⊗ Williford High School, Williford

Stone County

 Mountain View High School, Mountain View
 Rural Special High School, Fox
 Timbo High School, Timbo

Union County

Junction City High School, Junction City
Norphlet High School, Norphlet
Smackover High School, Smackover
Strong High School, Strong

El Dorado

El Dorado High School
Parkers Chapel High School

Van Buren County

Clinton High School, Clinton
Shirley High School, Shirley
South Side High School, Bee Branch

Washington County

 Elkins High School, Elkins
 Farmington High School, Farmington
 Greenland High School, Greenland
 Lincoln High School, Lincoln
 Prairie Grove High School, Prairie Grove
 West Fork High School, West Fork

Fayetteville

 Fayetteville High School
 # Haas Hall Academy

Springdale

 Har-Ber High School
 † Shiloh Christian School
 Springdale High School

White County

Bald Knob High School, Bald Knob
Bradford High School, Bradford
Pangburn High School, Pangburn
Rose Bud High School, Rose Bud
White County Central High School, Judsonia

Beebe

Beebe High School
 Lighthouse Christian Academy

Searcy

 † Harding Academy
Riverview High School
Searcy High School

Woodruff County

Augusta High School, Augusta
McCrory High School, McCrory

Yell County

Danville High School, Danville
Dardanelle High School, Dardanelle
Two Rivers High School, Plainview
Western Yell County High School, Havana

See also

 List of school districts in Arkansas
 Arkansas Activities Association

References

External links
 Search for Public Schools, National Center for Education Statistics
 Search for Private Schools, National Center for Education Statistics

Arkansas
High schools